Kenice Mobley is an American comedian. She was named to the 2021 Vulture list of Comedians You Should and Will Know. Her debut comedy album Follow Up Question was released in December 2022.

Life and career 
Mobley was raised in Charlotte, North Carolina. She received her bachelor's degree in psychology and history from North Carolina Central University. She began her stand-up career at an open mic in Los Angeles and later continued to perform in Boston, while in graduate school for film production at Boston University.

She was named to Vulture's 2021 list of Comedians You Should and Will Know. Mobley performed a set on The Tonight Show in 2021. Mobley also works for the Center for Media and Social Impact.

Mobley's debut comedy album Follow Up Question, filmed at Union Hall in New York, was released in December 2022. In a positive review, Clare Martin of Paste described the album: "Whether she’s talking about how her mom’s figure has "changed the pornography I can watch" or asking the audience about cum in jars, Mobley mines sophomoric comedic veins in hilarious and surprisingly incisive ways."

She resides in Brooklyn.

References

External links 
 Official website
 

Year of birth missing (living people)
Living people
African-American female comedians
21st-century African-American women
American stand-up comedians
North Carolina Central University alumni
Boston University alumni
Entertainers from North Carolina